The 2015 May Day protests were a series of international protests involving tens of thousands of people that took place worldwide on May Day (1 May 2015) over austerity measures and poor working conditions.

Locations

Italy
Protests in Milan were primarily peaceful with about 30,000 demonstrators attending according to organizers and denounced the Expo 2015 meeting. Some protests were violent with about 500 individuals equipped with motorcycle helmets and batons gathered near Piazza XXIV Maggio far from the Expo 15 convention. Violent protesters clashed with police, torched several vehicles and a few business, broke windows of shops and threw homemade explosives at some businesses.

Maldives

Aftermath of conviction of former president Mohamed Nasheed of Maldives, a series of small protests started in the capital city of Maldives. Opposition parties Adaalath Party & Maldivian Democratic Party joined to conduct the large protest on Mal'e City which is known as Maldivian May Day. It was estimated that around 7000 people around the Maldives came to the capital city of Maldives. After a bloody protest and the arrest of an opposition leader Imran Abdulla Protests was over around 00:30 in local time.

South Korea
Tens of thousands of protesters gathered in Seoul and threatened a "general strike" if the government performed the planned labor reforms.

Turkey
Authorities blocked access to Taksim Square by blocking transportation routes and dispersed protesters with water cannons and tears gas. It was estimated by Turkish media that 20,000 police were sent out with 62 water cannon trucks and 203 individuals involved in the Istanbul protests were arrested.

United States
An annual protest march was held in Seattle for numerous causes, such as immigrant rights, labor rights, and solidarity with the 2015 Baltimore protests. The originally peaceful protests turned violent later in the day when a group of self-described anarchists began smashing windows, burning trash cans, and clashing with riot police. Five officers ultimately suffered injuries, while sixteen people were arrested for property destruction and assault of police officers.

References

2015 protests
May Day protests
Protests in Seattle